John Glenn Boulevard is an arterial road serving the northwestern suburbs of Syracuse, New York, mainly Liverpool, Baldwinsville, and Clay. As currently constructed, it extends  from Interstate 690 (I-690) in Geddes to Buckley Road in Clay. In Onondaga County, the road is officially designated as the unsigned County Route 81 (CR 81).

Route description
John Glenn Boulevard begins at a modified directional T interchange with I-690 in Geddes. The westbound lanes also include a ramp to the northbound of New York State Route 48 (NY 48), which also terminates at the intersection with I-690. Heading eastbound, the boulevard has a railroad crossing before reaching an at-grade intersection with Farrell Road roughly half a mile later.

For the remainder of the roadway, John Glenn Boulevard passes over the Onondaga Lake connector to the Seneca River/Erie Canal and has at-grade intersections with NY 370 and CR 57 (the former NY 57), in addition to a couple of apartment complex entryways, before terminating at Buckley Road (CR 46) in Clay, New York.

History
The arterial was originally built in the mid 1960s, connecting several newly-built suburban neighborhoods to NY 57 and the New York State Thruway. It was named after former NASA astronaut and U.S. Senator John Glenn, the first American to orbit the Earth, which he accomplished in 1962.

The highway was originally supposed to extend to NY 481 but was never built past Buckley Road.

In 2016, a woman was killed on the highway when a tree fell on top of the SUV in which she was riding. The incident was later deemed a "freak accident".

Major intersections

See also
List of county routes in Onondaga County, New York

References

County routes in Onondaga County, New York
Transportation in Onondaga County, New York
Roads in New York (state)
John Glenn